Aftermath may refer to:

Companies
 Aftermath (comics), an imprint of Devil's Due Publishing
 Aftermath Entertainment, an American record label founded by Dr. Dre
 Aftermath Media, an American multimedia company
 Aftermath Services, an American crime-scene cleanup company

Film and television

Films
 Aftermath (1914 film), an American lost silent film
 Aftermath (1927 film), a German silent film
 Aftermath (1990 film) or Crash: The Mystery of Flight 1501, an American television film
 Aftermath (1994 film), a Spanish short horror film by Nacho Cerdà
 Aftermath (2001 film), a television movie starring Meredith Baxter
 Aftermath (2002 film), a film starring Sean Young
 Aftermath (2004 film), a Danish film
 Aftermath (2012 film), a Polish thriller and drama
 Aftermath (2013 film), a film starring Anthony Michael Hall
 Aftermath (2014 film), an apocalyptic thriller by Peter Engert
 Aftermath (2017 film), a film starring Arnold Schwarzenegger
 Aftermath (2021 film), a film starring Ashley Greene

 Aftermath: Population Zero, a 2008 Canadian television documentary film
 Aftermath: The Remnants of War, a 2001 Canadian documentary
 Aftermath: A Test of Love, a 1991 television movie about the Hi-Fi murders

 The Aftermath (1914 film), a silent film starring Harry von Meter
 The Aftermath (1982 film), a science fiction film starring Sid Haig
 The Aftermath (2019 film), a film starring Keira Knightley

Television

Series
 Aftermath (2010 TV series), a Canadian documentary series
 Aftermath (2014 South Korean series), a South Korean web series
 Aftermath (2016 TV series), a Canadian drama series
 Aftermath with William Shatner, a 2010–2011 American series
 Tsunami: The Aftermath, a 2006 American miniseries
 Leah Remini: Scientology and the Aftermath, a 2016-2019 American documentary series

Episodes
 "Aftermath" (Blake's 7)
 "Aftermath" (Daredevil)
 "Aftermath" (DCI Banks)
 "Aftermath" (The Good Doctor)
 "Aftermath" (McLeod's Daughters)
 "Aftermath" (Scream)
 "Aftermath" (Star Wars: The Bad Batch)
 "Aftermath" (Stargate Universe)
 "Aftermath" (Superstore)
 "The Aftermath" (30 Rock)
 "The Aftermath" (Dynasty 1985)
 "The Aftermath" (Dynasty 1987)
 "The Aftermath" (Dynasty 2021)
 "The Aftermath" (The Jacksons: A Family Dynasty)
 "The Aftermath" (The Legend of Korra)
 "The Aftermath" (The O.C.)

Games
 Aftermath, a 2012 DLC for Battlefield 3
 Aftermath!, a 1981 science fiction role-playing game
 Half-Life 2: Aftermath or Half-Life 2: Episode One, a 2006 first-person shooter video game
 The Aftermath, a 1997 expansion pack for Command & Conquer: Red Alert
 UFO: Aftermath, a 2003 real-time strategy and tactics video game

Literature

Fiction
 Aftermath (Robinson novel), a 2001 novel by Peter Robinson
 Aftermath, a 1997 novel by LeVar Burton
 Aftermath, a 2009 novel by Scott Campbell
 Aftermath, a 1998 Supernova Alpha novel by Charles Sheffield
 Star Wars: Aftermath trilogy, a 2015–2017 novel series by Chuck Wendig
 The Aftermath (novella), an unpublished novella by Stephen King
 The Aftermath, a 2007 novel in the Grand Tour series by Ben Bova
 The Aftermath, a 2013 novel by Rhidian Brook
 Aftermath, a 2021 novel by Preti Taneja

Nonfiction
 Aftermath: On Marriage and Separation, a 2012 memoir by Rachel Cusk
 Aftermath: World Trade Center Archive, a 2006 book of photographs and text by Joel Meyerowitz
 Aftermath: Life in the Fallout of the Third Reich, 1945–1955, a book by Harald Jähner
 Aftermath: The Remnants of War, a 1996 book by Donovan Webster
 Aftermath: Violence and the Remaking of a Self, a 2002 book by Susan Brison
 The Aftermath, a volume of The World Crisis, Winston Churchill's account of the First World War

Other
 Aftermath, an 1873 collection of poetry by Henry Wadsworth Longfellow

Music

Bands
 Aftermath (American band), a Chicago thrash band formed in 1985
 The Aftermath (Ingush duo), a Russian singer-songwriter duo formed in 2004
 The Aftermath (Irish band), a mod/pop band formed in 2006

Albums
 Aftermath (Amy Lee soundtrack), from the film War Story, 2014
 Aftermath (Battery album) or the title song, 1998
 Aftermath (Fever Fever album) or the title song, 2014
 Aftermath (Hillsong United album) or the title song, 2011
 Aftermath (Rolling Stones album), 1966
 Aftermath, by Axenstar, 2011
 Aftermath, by Elizabeth Cook, 2020
 The Aftermath (Bonded by Blood album) or the title song, 2012
 The Aftermath (Da Youngsta's album) or the title song, 1993
 The Aftermath (Dystopia album), 1999
 The Aftermath (Jonathan Coulton album), 2009
 The Aftermath (Midnattsol album) or the title song, 2018
 The Aftermath, by Kashmir, 2005
 Dr. Dre Presents the Aftermath or the title song, 1996

Songs
 "Aftermath" (Adam Lambert song), 2011
 "Aftermath" (Muse song), 2016
 "Aftermath" (R.E.M. song), 2004
 "Aftermath", by Candlemass from Chapter VI, 1992
 "Aftermath", by Caravan Palace from Robot Face, 2015
 "Aftermath", by Coldrain from Fateless, 2017
 "Aftermath", by Edge of Sanity from Crimson II, 2003
 "Aftermath", by Joe Budden from Mood Muzik 4: A Turn 4 the Worst, 2010
 "Aftermath", by Nightmares on Wax from A Word of Science: The First and Final Chapter, 1991
 "Aftermath", by Persuader from The Fiction Maze, 2014
 "Aftermath", by Phish from Phish, 1986
 "Aftermath", by Sonic Syndicate from Only Inhuman, 2007
 "Aftermath", by Strapping Young Lad from Strapping Young Lad, 2003
 "Aftermath", by The Ghost Inside from The Ghost Inside, 2020
 "Aftermath", by the Rolling Stones, 1965
 "Aftermath", by Tricky from Maxinquaye, 1995
 "Aftermath", by Yngwie Malmsteen from I Can't Wait, 1994
 "Aftermath (Here We Go)", by Dave Audé, 2014
 "The Aftermath", by Bob Seger and the Silver Bullet Band from Like a Rock, 1986
 "The Aftermath", by Iron Maiden from The X Factor, 1995
 "The Aftermath", by Kashmir from Zitilites, 2003
 "The Aftermath", by Origin from Antithesis, 2008
 "The Aftermath (The Guillotine III)", by Escape the Fate from Escape the Fate, 2010

Concerts
The Aftermath (Within Temptation)

Other uses
 The Aftermath, a season of the Discordian calendar

See also 
 AfterMASH, an American sitcom